George Augustine Hogan (September 25, 1885 – February 22, 1922) was an American professional baseball pitcher who played with the Kansas City Packers of the Federal League in .

External links

1885 births
1922 deaths
Kansas City Packers players
Major League Baseball pitchers
Baseball players from Ohio
People from Marion, Ohio
Covington Blue Sox players